

Ælfwine or Ælle was a medieval Bishop of Lichfield. He was consecrated between 903 and 915 and died between 935 and 941.

Ælfwine appears to have had a close relationship with King Æthelstan. Ælfwine was probably close to Æthelstan before he became king, and consistently attested the king's charters in a more prominent position than his status should have entitled him to. The historian Sarah Foot has suggested that Ælfwine may have been the "Æthelstan A", the name given by historians to the draftsman who crafted unusually detailed charters between 928 and 935, as he ceased witnessing at the same time as the Æthelstan A charters ended.

Citations

References

External links
 

Anglo-Saxon bishops of Lichfield
10th-century English bishops
10th-century deaths
Year of birth unknown
Year of death unknown